= Roosevelt Susi =

American politician (1919–2009)

Majority Leader of the Maine House of Representatives
- In office January 1, 1975 – January 3, 1977

Member of the Maine House of Representatives
- In office January 2, 1963 – January 3, 1977
- Succeeded by: Jasper Wyman

Personal details
- Born: Roosevelt Theodore Susi; July 7, 1919 Pittsfield, Maine, U.S.
- Died: February 25, 2009 (aged 89) Pittsfield, Maine, U.S.
- Party: Republican
- Education: University of Maine

Roosevelt Theodore Susi (July 7, 1919 – February 25, 2009) was an American politician, navy officer, businessman, and horse trainer who served as a member of the Maine House of Representatives for sixteen years before losing re-election in 1976 to Jasper Wyman. A Republican, he was the chamber's majority leader during his last two years in office.
